Pope Sixtus V (13 December 1521 – 27 August 1590), born Felice Piergentile, was head of the Catholic Church and ruler of the Papal States from 24 April 1585 to his death in  August 1590. As a youth, he joined the Franciscan order, where he displayed talents as a scholar and preacher, and enjoyed the patronage of Pius V, who made him a cardinal. As a cardinal, he was known as Cardinal Montalto.

As Pope, he energetically rooted out corruption and lawlessness across Rome, and launched a far-sighted rebuilding programme that continues to provoke controversy, as it involved the destruction of antiquities. The cost of these works was met by heavy taxation that caused much suffering. His foreign policy was regarded as over-ambitious, and he excommunicated both Queen Elizabeth I of England and King Henry IV of France. He is recognized as a significant figure of the Counter-Reformation. He is the most recent pope to date to take on the pontifical name "Sixtus".

Early life
Felice Piergentile was born on 13 December 1521 at Grottammare, in the Papal States, to Francesco Piergentile (also known as Peretto di Montalto, from the city of origin Montalto delle Marche), and Mariana da Frontillo. His father had taken refuge in Grottammare to escape the oppression of the Duke of Urbino, finding there a job as a gardener. Felice later adopted Peretti as his family name in 1551, and as a cardinal was known as "Cardinal Montalto" (to reflect his affection to his homeland).

Franciscan
At the age of 9 years old, Felice came back in Montalto to join his uncle in the Franciscan Convent of San Francesco delle Fratte. At the age of 12 he was initiated as a novice of the Franciscan Order, assuming the name of Fra Felice (Friar Felix) in 1535, maintaining his birth name. From this year, he started philosophical and theological studies, moving between different convents of the Order. He finally completed his studies in the Franciscan Magna Domus of Bologna on September 1544. He had three years earlier already been ordained as a deacon.

About 1552 he was noticed by Cardinal Rodolfo Pio da Carpi, Protector of the Franciscan order, Cardinal Ghislieri (later Pope Pius V) and Cardinal Caraffa (later Pope Paul IV), and from that time his advancement was assured. He was sent to Venice as inquisitor general of the Venetian Holy Inquisition, but was so severe and conducted matters in such a high-handed manner that he became embroiled in quarrels. In 1560, the Venetian government asked for his recall.

After a brief term as procurator of his order, he was attached in 1565 to the papal legation to Spain headed by Cardinal Ugo Boncampagni (later Pope Gregory XIII) which was sent to investigate a charge of heresy levelled against Bartolomé Carranza, Archbishop of Toledo. The violent dislike which Peretti conceived for Boncampagni had a marked influence upon his subsequent actions. He hurried back to Rome upon the accession of Pius V, who made him apostolic vicar of his order, and, later (1570), cardinal.

Cardinal
During the pontificate of his political enemy Gregory XIII (1572–1585), Cardinal Montalto, as he was generally called, lived in enforced retirement, occupied with the care of his property, the Villa Montalto, erected by Domenico Fontana close to the cardinal's beloved church on the Esquiline Hill, overlooking the ancient Baths of Diocletian. The first phase (1576–1580) of building was enlarged after Peretti became pope and was able to clear buildings to open four new streets in 1585–86. The villa contained two residences, the Palazzo Sistino or "Palazzo di Termini" and the casino, called the Palazzetto Montalto e Felice.

This clearance programme was an undoubted gain in the relief it brought to the congestion of the crowded medieval city. Clearly, however, Romans displaced by it were furious, and resentment was still felt centuries later, until the decision was taken to build the central railroad station, inaugurated by Pope Pius IX in 1863, the chosen site being the area of the Villa, which became doomed to destruction.

Cardinal Montalto's other occupation at this period was with his studies, one of the fruits of which was an edition of the works of Ambrose. As pope he would personally supervise the printing of an improved edition of Jerome's Vulgate.

Papacy

Election as pope

Though not neglecting to follow the course of affairs, Felice carefully avoided every occasion of offence. This discretion contributed not a little to his election to the papacy on 24 April 1585, with the title of Sixtus V to honor Pope Sixtus IV, also a Franciscan like himself. One of the things that commended his candidacy to certain cardinals may have been his physical vigour, which seemed to promise a long pontificate. His papal coronation was held on 1 May 1585 and he was crowned by the protodeacon Ferdinando de' Medici.

Reforms in the city of Rome
The terrible condition in which Pope Gregory XIII had left the Papal States called for prompt and stern measures. Sixtus proceeded with an almost ferocious severity against the prevailing lawlessness. Thousands of brigands were brought to justice: within a short time the country was again quiet and safe. It was claimed that there were more heads on spikes across the Ponte Sant'Angelo than melons for sale in the marketplace. And clergy and nuns were executed if they broke their vows of chastity.

Next Sixtus set to work to repair the finances. By the sale of offices, the establishment of new "Monti" and by levying new taxes, he accumulated a vast surplus, which he stored up against certain specified emergencies, such as a crusade or the defence of the Holy See. Sixtus prided himself upon his hoard, but the method by which it had been amassed was financially unsound: some of the taxes proved ruinous, and the withdrawal of so much money from circulation could not fail to cause distress.

Immense sums were spent upon public works, in carrying through the comprehensive planning that had come to fruition during his retirement, bringing water to the waterless hills in the Acqua Felice, feeding twenty-seven new fountains; laying out new arteries in Rome, which connected the great basilicas, even setting his engineer-architect Domenico Fontana to replan the Colosseum as a silk-spinning factory housing its workers.

Inspired by the ideal of the Renaissance city, Pope Sixtus V's ambitious urban reform programme transformed the old environment to emulate the "long straight streets, wide regular spaces, uniformity and repetitiveness of structures, lavish use of commemorative and ornamental elements, and maximum visibility from both linear and circular perspective." The Pope set no limit to his plans, and achieved much in his short pontificate, always carried through at top speed: the completion of the dome of St. Peter's; the loggia of Sixtus in the Basilica di San Giovanni in Laterano; the chapel of the Praesepe in Santa Maria Maggiore; additions or repairs to the Quirinal, Lateran and Vatican palaces; the erection of four obelisks, including that in Saint Peter's Square; the opening of six streets; the restoration of the aqueduct of Septimius Severus ("Acqua Felice"); the integration of the Leonine City in Rome as XIV rione (Borgo).

Besides numerous roads and bridges, he sweetened the city air by financing the reclamation of the Pontine Marshes. Consequently, the spatial organization, monumental inscriptions and restorations throughout the city reinforced the control, surveillance, and authority that alluded to the power of Pope Sixtus V. Good progress was made, with more than  reclaimed and opened to agriculture and manufacture. The project was abandoned upon his death.

Sixtus had no appreciation of antiquities, which were employed as raw material to serve his urbanistic and Christianising programs: Trajan's Column and the Column of Marcus Aurelius (at the time misidentified as the Column of Antoninus Pius) were made to serve as pedestals for the statues of SS Peter and Paul; the Minerva of the Capitol was converted into an emblem of Christian Rome; the Septizodium of Septimius Severus was demolished for its building materials.

Church administration
The subsequent administrative system of the Catholic Church owed much to Sixtus. He limited the College of Cardinals to seventy. He doubled the number of the congregations and enlarged their functions, assigning to them the principal role in the transaction of business (1588). He regarded the Jesuits with disfavour and suspicion. He mediated radical changes to their constitution, but death prevented the execution of his purpose.

In 1588, he established the 15 congregations by his constitution Immensa Aeterni Dei.

Sixtine Vulgate and Septuagint 

In May 1587, the Sixtine Septuagint was published under the auspices of Sixtus V.

In May 1590 the Sixtine Vulgate was issued.

The edition was preceded by the Bull Aeternus ille, in which the Pope declared the authenticity of the new Bible. The bull stipulated "that it was to be considered as the authentic edition recommended by the Council of Trent, that it should be taken as the standard of all future reprints, and that all copies should be corrected by it." "This edition was not to be reprinted for 10 years except at the Vatican, and after that any edition must be compared with the Vatican edition, so that 'not even the smallest particle should be altered, added or removed' under pain of the 'greater excommunication.

Jaroslav Pelikan, without giving any more details, says that this edition "proved to be so defective that it was withdrawn".

Consistories

Sixtus V created 33 cardinals in eight consistories during his reign, which included his grandnephew Alessandro Peretti di Montalto and his future successor Ippolito Aldobrandini who would later become Pope Clement VIII.

Beatifications and canonizations
During his pontificate, Sixtus V beatified Ubaldesca Taccini (1587) and canonized one saint, Didacus of Alcalá (10 July 1588).

Roman Curia 
In 1588, Sixtus V published the bull Immensa Aeterni Dei which reorganised the Roman Curia into departments.

Foreign relations

In his larger political relations, Sixtus entertained fantastic ambitions, such as the annihilation of the Turks, the conquest of Egypt, the transport of the Holy Sepulchre to Italy, and the accession of his nephew to the throne of France. The situation in which he found himself was difficult: he could not countenance the designs of those he considered as heretical princes, and yet he mistrusted King Philip II of Spain and viewed with apprehension any extension of his power.

Sixtus agreed to renew the excommunication of Queen Elizabeth I of England, and to grant a large subsidy to the Armada of Philip II, but, knowing the slowness of Spain, would give nothing until the expedition actually landed in England. This way, he saved a fortune that would otherwise have been lost in the failed campaign. Sixtus had Cardinal William Allen draw up the An Admonition to the Nobility and People of England and Ireland, a proclamation to be published in England if the invasion had been successful. The extant document comprised all that could be said against Elizabeth I, and the indictment is therefore fuller and more forcible than any other put forward by the religious exiles, who were generally reticent in their complaints. Allen carefully consigned his publication to the fire, and it is only known of through one of Elizabeth's spies, who had stolen a copy.

Sixtus excommunicated King Henry III of Navarre, who was the heir presumptive to the throne of France, and contributed to the Catholic League, but he chafed under his forced alliance with King Philip II of Spain, and looked for escape. The victories of Henry and the prospect of his conversion to Catholicism raised Sixtus V's hopes, and in corresponding degree determined Philip II to tighten his grip upon his wavering ally. The Pope's negotiations with Henry's representative evoked a bitter and menacing protest and a categorical demand for the performance of promises. Sixtus took refuge in evasion, and temporised until his death on 27 August 1590.

Contraception, abortion, and adultery
Sixtus extended the penalty of excommunication relating to the Roman Catholic Church's teaching on contraception and abortion. While the Church taught that abortion and contraception were gravely sinful actions ("mortal sins"), it did not apply to all mortal sins the additional penalty of excommunication. Although homicide had always required this penalty, contraception had not. Patristic and medieval theologians and physicians had long speculated and debated over the exact moment the fertilised egg became a human being.

While there was broad agreement among them that life was present at conception and that it could only become a human being, the thinking was that this did not necessarily mean God had infused the rational, immortal soul into the body at conception. Following Aristotle, many in the West had theorized that the matter had to be prepared to a certain point before this could happen and, prior to then, there was only a vegetative or sensitive soul, but not a human soul. This meant that killing an organism before the human soul is infused would still be a grave sin of abortion (or at least contraception), but that it was not properly a homicide and, thus, did not require excommunication.

Some theologians argued that only after proof of the "quickening" (when the mother can feel the fetus's movement in her womb, usually about 20 weeks into gestation) that there was incontrovertible evidence that ensoulment had already occurred. Until Sixtus V, canon lawyers had applied the code from Gratian whereby excommunications were only given to abortions after the quickening. In 1588 the pope issued a papal bull, Effraenatam or Effrenatam ("Without Restraint"), which declared that the canonical penalty of excommunication would be levied for any form of contraception and for abortions at any stage in fetal development. The reasoning on the latter would be that the soul of the unborn child would be denied Heaven.

Sixtus also attempted in 1586 to introduce into the secular law in Rome the Old Testament penalty for adultery, which is death. The measure ultimately failed.

Death and legacy
Sixtus V died on 27 August 1590 from malaria. The pope became ill with a fever on 24 August; it intensified the following day.

As Sixtus V lay on his deathbed, he was loathed by his political subjects, but history has recognized him as one of the most important popes. On the negative side, he could be impulsive, obstinate, severe, and autocratic. On the positive side, he was open to large ideas and threw himself into his undertakings with energy and determination; this often led to success. His pontificate saw great enterprises and great achievements.

The changes wrought by Sixtus on the street plan of Rome were documented in a film, Rome: Impact of an Idea, featuring Edmund N. Bacon and based on sections of his book Design of Cities.

About 5,000 bandits were executed by Sixtus V in the five years before his death in 1590, but there were reputedly 27,000 more at liberty throughout Central Italy.

He was the last pope to date to use the name Sixtus.

References

Sources

External links

 Montalto delle Marche city of Sisto V
 Papa Sisto V
 Piazza di Termini, Rome: timeline, including the Villa
 Visit Montalto delle Marche where Pope Sixtus V trained
 FIU

Works

 
 Latin text of Effraenatum perditissimorum

 
1521 births
1590 deaths
16th-century Italian Roman Catholic bishops
Bishops in le Marche
Conventual Friars Minor
Counter-Reformation
Franciscan popes
Italian popes
Ministers General of the Order of Friars Minor Conventual
People from the Province of Ascoli Piceno
People of the French Wars of Religion
Popes
16th-century popes
Cardinals created by Pope Pius V
Burials at Santa Maria Maggiore